Shen Shanbao (沈善宝, 1808–1862) courtesy name Xiangpei 湘佩 and style name Xihu sanren 西湖散人 was a Chinese poet and writer active during the Qing Dynasty.  She is the author of the Mingyuan Shihua, which provided biographical material on 500 Qing women poets, including herself.

Biography
She was born in Hangzhou, which in the early nineteenth century was a center for women artists and writers.  Shen's father committed suicide in 1819 and her mother died in 1832. She sold her paintings and poetry to support herself.  In 1837, in a marriage arranged by her foster mother, she married Wu Lingyun 武凌云, a high official and holder of the jinshi degree (the highest civil service degree). She was Wu's second wife; upon her marriage she became stepmother to his children. After her marriage to Wu, she moved to Beijing.

In Beijing, Shen made contact with a circle of women writers, including Liang Desheng, Xu Yunjiang, Xu Zongyan, Gu Taiqing, Gong Zihang (the sister of Gong Zichen) and Li Peijin.  She was also important as a teacher; she was known to have more than a hundred female disciples. She was also friends with the writer Ding Pei, who wrote a preface for her first poetry collection in 1836.

Some of her work has been translated into English.

See also
Qing poetry

Notes

References

Sources
"Fong Embroidery Paper", Columbia University, last accessed June 9, 2007
Wang Lijian王力堅,  Qingdai caiyuan Shen Shanbao yanjiu,清代才媛沈善寳研究 (A Study of the Qing Poet Shan Shanbao)  Taipei: Liren shuju, 2009.

External links
 Texts of her poems and references to her (in Chinese) appear in Ming Qing Women Writers Database.

1808 births
1862 deaths
Chinese women poets
Qing dynasty poets
19th-century Chinese women writers
Poets from Zhejiang
19th-century Chinese poets
Writers from Hangzhou